Ruchi Vira is an Indian politician and a member of the 16th Legislative Assembly of Uttar Pradesh of India. She represents the Bijnor constituency of Uttar Pradesh and is a member of the Samajwadi Party.

Early life and education
Ruchi Vira was born in Bijnor district, Uttar Pradesh. She holds Bachelor of Arts degree from Mahatama Jyotiba Phule Rohilkhand University.

Political career
Ruchi Vira has been a MLA for one term. She represents the Bijnor constituency and is a member of the Samajwadi Party. Vira was elected as MLA during the by-election after the sitting MLA Kunwar Bhartendra Singh got elected to 16th Lok Sabha.

On 28 December 2015, Veera was suspended by the SP for anti-party activities. 4 others were expelled from the party.

She lost her seat in the 2017 Uttar Pradesh Assembly election to Suchi Chaudhary of the Bharatiya Janata Party.
Veera joined Bahujan Samaj Party. 
Candidate MP Aonla, Bareilly, Veera was loser
Candidate MLA Bijnor (Assembly constituency)

Posts Held

See also
 Bijnor
 Government of India
 Politics of India
 Samajwadi Party
 Uttar Pradesh Legislative Assembly

References 

1961 births
Living people
Samajwadi Party politicians
Uttar Pradesh MLAs 2012–2017
People from Bijnor
Bahujan Samaj Party politicians from Uttar Pradesh
People from Bijnor district
Samajwadi Party politicians from Uttar Pradesh